Swing bowling is a technique used for bowling in the sport of cricket. Practitioners are known as swing bowlers. Swing bowling is generally classed as a subtype of fast bowling.

The aim of swing bowling is to cause the ball to move in the air (or 'swing') whilst delivering mainly fast-paced balls to the batsman, in the hope that the change in the ball's flight path will deceive the batsman and cause them to play the ball incorrectly. Swing bowling is not to be confused with spin bowling, which involves bowling slow-pace balls which change direction primarily after making contact with the ground.

Swing bowling involves the use of a newer ball which is only slightly worn. The bowling side will continually polish one side of the ball by applying saliva and sweat to it as well as rubbing it against their clothing to shine it, whilst leaving the opposite side unshined. The speed of airflow over the rough and smooth sides of the ball will cause the ball to move in flight towards the rough side and away from the shiny side. Swing bowlers will often use a subtly altered grip on the ball to accentuate this effect.

The two main forms of swing are inswing, where the ball begins wider of the batsman and travels into the batsman's body, angling towards the stumps, and outswing, where the ball begins in line with the stumps but moves so that it is slightly wider of the stumps by the time it reaches the batsman. As the shiny side will also become worn over the course of play, swing bowling is usually effective when the ball is newer, with the older ball being more useful for spin bowling or other forms of fast bowling. However, there are other types of swing, such as reverse swing, which involve using a much more worn ball.

As swing bowling is heavily dependent on the condition of the ball, many ball tampering controversies have been related to it, where teams have tried to illegally alter the wear of the ball using materials such as sandpaper to produce additional swing.

History

Theory

The purpose of swing bowling is to get the cricket ball to deviate sideways as it moves through the air towards or away from the batsman. To do this, the bowler makes use of six factors:

 The raised seam of the cricket ball
 The angle of the seam to the direction of travel
 The wear and tear on the ball
 The polishing liquid used on the ball
 The speed of the delivery
 The bowler's action

Asymmetry of the ball is encouraged by the polishing of one side of the ball by members of the fielding team, while allowing the opposite side to deteriorate through wear and tear. With time, this produces a difference in the aerodynamic properties of the two sides.

Both turbulent and laminar airflow contribute to swing. Air in laminar flow separates from the surface of the ball earlier than air in turbulent flow, so that the separation point moves toward the front of the ball on the laminar side.  On the turbulent flow side it remains towards the back, inducing a greater lift force on the turbulent airflow side of the ball.  The calculated net lift force is not enough to account for the amount of swing observed. Additional force is provided by the pressure-gradient force.

To induce the pressure-gradient force the bowler must create regions of high and low static pressure on opposing sides of the ball. The ball is then "sucked" from the region of high static pressure towards the region of low static pressure. The Magnus effect uses the same force but by manipulating spin across the direction of motion. A layer of fluid, in this case air, will have a greater velocity when moving over another layer of fluid than it would have had if it had been moving over a solid, in this case the surface of the ball.  The greater the velocity of the fluid, the lower its static pressure.

Cold and humid weather are said to enhance swing. Colder air is denser and so may affect the differential forces the ball experiences in flight. When looking at humidity, changes between 0% and 40% humidity appear to have little to no effect on the ball's swing; yet, when approaching  100% humidity "condensation shock" has been observed enhancing the swing of the ball.

Conventional swing

Typically, a swing bowler aligns the seam and the sides of the ball to reinforce the swing effect. This can be done in two ways:
Outswinger: An outswinger to a right-handed batsman can be bowled by aligning the seam slightly to the left towards the slips and placing the roughened side of the ball on the left. To extract consistent swing, a bowler can also rotate his wrist toward the slips while keeping his arm straight. To a right-handed batsman, this results in the ball moving away to the off side while in flight, usually outwards from his body. Malcolm Marshall, Richard Hadlee, Dominic Cork, Courtney Walsh and Dale Steyn have been great exponents of the outswingers.
Inswinger: An inswinger to a right-handed batsman can be bowled by aligning the seam slightly to the right and placing the roughened side of the ball on the right. To extract consistent swing, a bowler can also rotate or "open up" his wrist towards leg slip. To a right-handed batsman, this results in the ball moving in to the leg side while in flight, usually inwards towards his body.

The curvature of swing deliveries can make them difficult for a batsman to hit with his bat. Typically, bowlers more commonly bowl outswingers, as they tend to move away from the batsman, meaning he has to "chase" the ball to hit it. Hitting away from the batsman's body is dangerous, as it leaves a gap between the bat and body through which the ball may travel to hit the wicket. Also, if the batsman misjudges the amount of swing, he can hit the ball with an edge of the bat. An inside edge can ricochet on to the wicket, resulting in him being out bowled, while an outside edge can fly to the wicket-keeper or slip fielders for a catch.

There has been a distinct lack of left-arm swing bowlers in the game. Some of the most famous left-arm bowlers were Pakistan's Wasim Akram, India's Zaheer Khan, Australia's Alan Davidson and Sri Lanka's Chaminda Vaas.

When the ball is new the seam is used to create a layer of turbulent air on one side of the ball, by angling it to one side and spinning the ball along the seam. This changes the separation points of the air with the ball; this turbulent air creates a greater coverage of air, providing lift. The next layer of air will have a greater velocity over the side with the turbulent air due to the greater air coverage and as there is a difference in air velocity, the static pressure of both sides of the ball are different and the ball is both 'lifted' and 'sucked' towards the turbulent airflow side of the ball.

Reverse swing

Normal swing occurs mostly when the ball is fairly new. As it wears more, the aerodynamics of the asymmetry changes and it is more difficult to extract a large amount of swing. When the ball becomes very old – around 50 or more overs old – it begins to swing towards the shine. It is mainly helpful for bowlers in Test matches. This is known as reverse swing, meaning that a natural outswinger will become an inswinger and vice versa. However, the new ball may reverse its trajectory if the speed is high (more than 90 mph). This is also called contrast swing or reverse swing. In essence, both sides of a cricket ball have turbulent flow, but in reverse swing, the seam causes the airflow to separate earlier on one side. The side of the ball that has been shined experiences quicker airflow, while on the other side, the rougher surface disrupts the airflow, slowing that side of the ball down. This causes the ball to swing either outwards or inwards, depending on how it has been released from the hand when bowled, with the ball moving towards the side on which the ball is shined.

Reverse swing tends to be stronger than normal swing, and to occur late in the ball's trajectory. This gives it a very different character from normal swing, and because batsmen experience it less often, they generally find it much more difficult to defend against. It is also possible for a ball to swing normally in its early flight, and then to alter its swing as it approaches the batsman. This can be done in two ways one for the ball to reverse its direction of swing, giving it an 'S' trajectory: the other is for it to adopt a more pronounced swing in the same direction in which the swing is already curving; either alteration can be devastating for the batsman. In the first instance, he is already committed to playing the swing one way, which will be the wrong way to address swing which is suddenly coming from the opposite direction: in the second instance, his stance will be one which is appropriate for the degree, or extent, of the expected swing, and which could suddenly leave him vulnerable to LBW, being caught behind, or bowled. Two consecutive deliveries from Wasim Akram, one of each type, were considered to be the turning point of the 1992 World Cup Final.

Pioneers and notable practitioners of reverse swing have mostly been Pakistani fast bowlers. In the early days of reverse swing, Pakistani bowlers were accused of ball tampering to achieve the conditions of the ball that allow reverse swing. According to Shaharyar Khan, reverse swing was invented by Salim Mir, who played for the Punjab Cricket Club in Lahore and taught it to his team-mate Sarfraz Nawaz. Sarfraz Nawaz introduced reverse swing into international cricket during the late 1970s, and passed their knowledge on to their team-mate Imran Khan, who in turn taught the duo of Wasim Akram and Waqar Younis. The English pair of Andrew Flintoff and Simon Jones, having been taught by Troy Cooley and the Indian bowlers like Zaheer Khan and Ajit Agarkar, were also well known for the ability to reverse swing, among many others. Bowlers tend to disguise the direction of reverse swing by running up starting with the opposite hand before switching hands and covering the ball for as long as possible before release. Neil Wagner utilizes this to show the ball is reversing, but disguises the direction of swing.

Reverse swing occurs in exactly the same manner as conventional swing, despite popular misconception. Over time the rough side becomes too rough and the tears become too deep – this is why golf ball dimples are never below a certain depth, and so "conventional" swing weakens over time; the separation point moves toward the front of the ball on the rough side. When polishing the shiny side of the ball, numerous liquids are used, such as sweat, saliva, sunscreen, hair gel (which bowlers may apply to their hair before a game) and other illegal substances like Vaseline (applied to the clothing where the ball is polished). These liquids penetrate the porous surface of the leather ball. Over time the liquid expands and stretches the surface of the ball (which increases the surface area meaning more lift) and creates raised bumps on the polished side, due to the non-uniform nature of the expansion. The valleys between the bumps hold the air in the same manner as the tears on the rough side. This creates a layer of air over the shiny side, moving the separation point towards the back of the ball on the shiny side. The greater air coverage is now on the shiny side, giving rise to more lift and faster secondary airflow on that side. There is therefore lower static pressure on the shiny side, causing the ball to swing towards it, not away from it as in conventional swing. The rough side tears hold the air more easily than the shiny side valleys, so to maintain the air within the valleys the initial air layer must have a very high velocity, which is why reverse swing is primarily, but not necessarily, achieved by fast bowlers. Due to the less static nature of the initial air layer it takes longer for the swing to occur, which is why it occurs later in the delivery. This is why conventional and reverse swing can occur in the same delivery.

When the ball is older and there is an asymmetry in roughness the seam no longer causes the pressure difference, and can actually reduce the swing of the ball. Air turbulence is no longer used to create separation point differences and therefore the lift and pressure differences. On the rough side of the ball there are scratches and pits in the ball's surface.  These irregularities act in the same manner as the dimples of a golf ball: they trap the air, creating a layer of trapped air next to the rough side of the ball, which moves with the surface of the ball. The smooth side does not trap a layer of air. The next layer of air outward from the ball will have a greater velocity over the rough side, due to its contact with a layer of trapped air, rather than solid ball. This lowers the static pressure relative to the shiny side, which swings the ball. If the scratches and tears completely cover the rough side of the ball, the separation point on the rough side will move to the back of the ball, further than that of the turbulent air, thereby creating more lift and faster air flow.  This is why a new ball will swing more than an old ball. If the seam is used to create the turbulent air on the rough side, the tears will not fill as quickly as they would with laminar flow, dampening the lift and pressure differences.

Playing swing bowling

Firstly, a batsman needs good eye reflexes which are considered to be a key skill when facing swing bowling. Secondly, a batsman often needs to anticipate beforehand what the ball will do and adjust accordingly to play swing bowling. This can be done by observing the bowler's grip and action (which may have a marked difference depending on which type of swinger is to be delivered), by observing the field set, which may depend on the types of deliveries expected (as a rule outswingers will have more slips assigned) or by means of prior knowledge of the bowler; many can bowl or are proficient in only one type of swing. Traditional methods include the batsmen playing the ball as late as possible, and not playing away from the body. Other effective measures for combating swing bowling include standing well outside the crease, thus giving the ball less time to swing; and guessing the direction of swing based on the seam position observed in the ball's flight.

Controversy regarding reverse swing has never left modern cricket, as the Pakistani team was accused of ball tampering by the Australian umpire Darrell Hair during the fourth test against England in 2006 when the ball began to reverse swing after the 50th over. His co-umpire Billy Doctrove supported him. A hearing subsequently found that there was insufficient evidence to convict anyone of ball tampering.

See also
Cricket terminology
Curveball
Seam bowling

References

External links

Excerpt from DG Bradman's The Art of Cricket describing swing bowling.
The Basics of Swing bowling explained by M.R.Baig on Cricketfundas.com
Mysterious art of reverse swing baffles even cricket experts
Reverse swing or super swing?
The science of swing bowling
Why cricket ball swings? Explained with the help of a diagram

Cricket terminology
Bowling (cricket)
Aerodynamics